The Mausoleum of Glanum is a Gallo-Roman monument erected between 30 and 20 BC, located south of Saint-Rémy-de-Provence, France. It stands after the pomerium of the city, a few hundred meters north of the archaeological excavations of Glanum, it is in an exceptional state of conservation, one of the best preserved Roman structures in the world.

The mausoleum is believed to be a cenotaph erected in memory of a man of the Julii family, who would have been granted citizenship and his name by Julius Caesar for his service in the Roman army, following the conquest of Gaul. Henri Rolland, left to suggest that it was a mausoleum dedicated to the memory of Caius and Lucius Caesar, grandsons of the emperor Augustus.

The mausoleum of Glanum is the subject of a classification as a historical monument by the List of 1840.

With the Arc de Saint-Rémy-de-Provence, a few meters away, it forms what is traditionally called the "Antiques of Saint-Rémy-de-Provence".

References

Roman sites in Provence